Igneo is the fourth album by Italian band Zu, involving Ken Vandermark on sax, Jeb Bishop on trombone, Fred Lonberg-Holm on cello and Jacopo Battaglia on drums .

The record was produced by Steve Albini.

Track list
 The Elusive Character Of Victory - 2:18
 Solar Anus - 3:52
 Eli, Eli, Elu - 6:27
 Arbol De La Esperanza Mantente Firme - 2:31
 Monte Zu - 4:55
 Untitled Samba For Kat Ex - 2:16
 Muro Torto - 5:02
 Tikkun Olam - 2:12
 Mar Glaciale Artico - 10:29

References

Zu (band) albums
2002 albums